James Ole Kiyiapi is a Kenyan academician and politician. In the 2013 Kenyan general elections, Ole kiyiapi vied for the seat of president under the Restore and Build Kenya Party.

Early life
James Ole Kiyiapi was born on 17 May 1961 at Osupuko Location Transmara District, Kenya. His was a humble background. His father, Daudi ole Kapur belonged to the Ilnyangusi age set and had two wives with Kiyiapi's mother, Naomi being the second. Kiyiapi is the last born of Naomi's six children. As a boy, he grew up herding his fathers flock and lived a typical village life.

Education 
Ole Kiyiapi holds a Doctor of Philosophy degree (PhD) in Forestry from the University of Toronto. He also has a Master and Bachelor of Science degrees from Moi University.

Career
 Prior to entering the race for the presidency of Kenya he served as a permanent secretary in the Ministries of Education and Local Government. He also previously served as an associate professor at Moi University.

References 

1961 births
Living people
Moi University alumni
University of Toronto alumni
Academic staff of Moi University
Restore and Build Kenya politicians
People from Narok County
Candidates for President of Kenya